Methoxymethanol is a chemical compound which is both an ether and an alcohol, a hemiformal. The structural formula can be written as CH3OCH2OH. It has been discovered in space.

Formation
Methoxymethanol forms spontaneously when a water solution of formaldehyde and methanol are mixed. or when formaldehyde is bubbled through methanol.

In space methoxymethanol can form when methanol radicals (CH2OH or CH3O) react. These are radiolysis products derived when ultraviolet light or cosmic rays hit frozen methanol.

Methanol can react with carbon dioxide and hydrogen at 80°C and some pressure with a ruthenium or cobalt catalyst, to yield some methoxymethanol.

Properties
Different conformations of the molecule are Gauche-gauce (Gg), Gauche-gauce' (Gg'), and Trans-gauche (Tg).

References

Ethers
Primary alcohols